Mohammed Abdur Rahim (born 12 December 1974) is a Bangladeshi cricketer, born in Rajshahi. He is also known by the nickname of Hira.
Rahim has never played first-class cricket, and his single appearance at List A level came in the 2000–01 season, when he appeared for Rajshahi Division against Biman Bangladesh Airlines at Savar. He was dismissed for a second-ball duck.

References

External links
 

Living people
Rajshahi Division cricketers
1974 births
Bangladeshi cricketers